Anda Lighthouse is a coastal lighthouse in Øksnes Municipality in Nordland county, Norway. It is located on the island of Anden in the Vesterålen islands. The lighthouse was built in 1932 and it was the last new lighthouse that was built in Norway. When it was automated in 1987, it was the last staffed lighthouse station in the country.

The white, red or green light (depending on direction) emits an occulting light once every 6 seconds. The lighthouse also emits a racon signal "T". The lighthouse is state-owned, and has historic value as an example of period concrete construction. Although it has been modernised, many original elements remain. The ruins of an outhouse lie nearby.

See also

Lighthouses in Norway
List of lighthouses in Norway

References

External links
 Norsk Fyrhistorisk Forening 

Lighthouses completed in 1932
Øksnes
Lighthouses in Nordland
Vesterålen